Skulsk  is a village in Konin County, Greater Poland Voivodeship, in west-central Poland. It is the seat of the gmina (administrative district) called Gmina Skulsk.

The village has a population of 1,400.

References

Skulsk